Nathaniel "Texas Jack" Reed (March 23, 1862 – January 7, 1950) was a 19th-century American outlaw responsible for many stagecoach, bank, and train robberies throughout the American Southwest during the 1880s and '90s. He acted on his own and also led a bandit gang, operating particularly in the Rocky Mountains and Indian Territory.

Reed is claimed to have been the last survivor of the "47 most notorious outlaws" of Indian Territory. He became an evangelist in his later years, and could often be seen on the streets of Tulsa preaching against the dangers of following a "life of crime". His memoirs were published in the 1930s, and are considered valuable collectors' items (one copy was reportedly sold on the internet for $1,500 in 2007). He claimed to have ridden with the Dalton gang, Bill Doolin, Henry Starr and other outlaws and bandits of the old west. He may have also helped Cherokee Bill, a fellow outlaw from the Indian Territory, in his escape from Fort Smith during the 1880s.

As with many others of the era, Reed's colorful stories of his almost 10-year career as an outlaw were probably exaggerated by later writers. He claimed to have ridden briefly with the Daltons, and participated in their dual bank robberies in Coffeyville in 1892, as well as in the infamous 1893 gunfight at Ingalls. However, there is no corroborating evidence that he was involved in either of those events.

Biography

Early life
Reed was born in Madison County, Arkansas. His father, Mason Henry Reed, was killed in action fighting for the Union Army during the American Civil War, probably at the Battle of Campbell's Station on November 16, 1863. His mother was Sarah Elizabeth Prater. Reed lived with a number of relatives, including his maternal grandparents, until 1883 when, at the age of 21, he moved to the American frontier. He worked at various jobs in Idaho, Wyoming, Colorado, Texas until he reached Oklahoma, where he became a ranch hand for the Tarry outfit.

During the summer of 1885, his foreman recruited him to rob a train at La Junta, Colorado. In the course of the robbery, Reed entered the passenger car firing his pistol to keep the passengers under control. He later received $6,000 for his part in the hold up. Encouraged by this success, Reed gave up working as a cowboy and became an outlaw. During the next nine years he and his gang robbed trains, stagecoaches, banks and, on one occasion, captured a large shipment of bullion in California.

Robbery at Blackstone Switch
During the early 1890s, when he was living near Muskogee, Oklahoma, Reed learned that a gold shipment was leaving Dallas, Texas on November 13, 1894. He recruited Buz Luckey, William "Will" Smith and Tom Root, and selected Blackstone Switch at Wybark as the site for the robbery. The plan was for Reed to throw the switch as the train approached then, as it entered onto a sidetrack, the gang would use dynamite to enter the express car. Root, a full-blooded Cherokee known for his size and strength, would enter the express car, break open the strong boxes, and bring out the gold. Smith would hold a gun on the engineer and fireman while Luckey stayed with the horses.

Despite their practice staged-robbery the previous day, as the Katy No. 2 approached, Reed threw the switch too early. Engineer Joseph Hotchkiss stopped the train when he saw the signal light change, far short of the siding. Reed and the others were forced to run towards the train yelling and shooting. Hotchkiss and the fireman alerted the messengers using the bell cord connected to the car and jumped off the train to hide in a small ravine nearby.

The railroad company had anticipated the possibility of a robbery, and had moved the gold to another train, putting in its place several armed messengers to guard the express car including Bud Ledbetter, Paden Tolbert, Sid Johnson, Frank Jones. When Reed and the others approached the express car, he called for the messengers to leave the car. When they refused, Reed and Root took cover behind some trees and began shooting into the car. The messengers returned fire, resulting in a gunfight that lasted for nearly an hour. Eventually one of Reed's men was killed; Reed jumped onto the train and went through the passenger cars forcing passengers to put their valuables into a sack before he and his gang fled.

As they rode away, Reed was shot by Bud Ledbetter; the pain from his wound grew so severe that his partners were forced to leave him behind for the night. He gave them some of his loot, and kept the rest of it in a sack to use as a pillow. He lay on a blanket hiding under a rock ledge until he was found by an Indian woman, who nursed him back to health.

The American Express Company offered a reward of $250 for the arrest and conviction of each member of the gang. An extensive manhunt was conducted by U.S. Marshals George Crump and S. Morton Rutherford, and large groups of deputies were sent into the Indian Territory and Creek Nation. While burning the canebrakes in the Verdigris bottoms, one deputy found the burnt remains of Reed's saddle and threatened to destroy the crops of local residents if they did not turn over Reed and his men. This was considered a legal act, authorized by "The Hanging Judge" Isaac Parker himself, but no one came forward with information. Reed was warned of the search and decided to leave the territory as soon as he was able. He arrived in Seneca, Missouri on December 9, where Bill Lawrence took care of him.

Once fully recovered from his wounds Reed returned to Arkansas in February 1895, where he stayed with his brother in Madison County. Having decided to retire from a life of crime, he wrote to Judge Isaac Parker, agreeing to testify against the man who planned the robbery in exchange for probation, although he did not participate in the proceedings. Smith managed to disappear, but U.S. Marshal Newton LaForce was successful in tracking down Luckey and Root to the latter's home in Broken Arrow, 15 miles south of Tulsa, Oklahoma. The two fugitives were subsequently killed in a gunfight with LaForce and his men on December 4, 1894.

Later years
Despite Parker's promise of immunity, Reed was convicted and sentenced to serve five years in prison. However, he served less than one, as shortly before his own death Parker granted Reed his parole, in November 1896. Reed subsequently carried his signed parole from Judge Parker around with him, along with a letter signed by Ledbetter acknowledging that Ledbetter had shot him.

After his release Reed became an evangelist, preaching the rewards of living a respectable, law-abiding life. He also toured the country with a series of Wild West shows. His memoirs, The Life of Texas Jack, were published in 1936, and 35,000 copies of several published pamphlets and dime novels describing his life as an outlaw were sold before his death at home in Tulsa, Oklahoma, at the age of 87. He was buried in St. Paul, Arkansas.

References

Further reading

Books
Croy, Homer. He Hanged Them High: An Authentic Account of the Fanatical Judge who Hanged Eighty-Eight Men. New York: Duel, Sloan & Pierce, 1952.
Drago, Harry Sinclair. The Organized Bands of Bank and Train Robbers Who Terrorized the Middle West for Half a Century. New York: Bramhall House, 1964.

Magazine articles
Cain, Lianne. "'Texas Jack' and the Blackstone Train Robbery". True West. (January 1996): 14.
Reed, Nathaniel. "Train Holdup at Blackstone Switch". The West. (May 1964): 16.
Shirley, Glenn. "The Bungled Job at Blackstone Switch". True West. (June 1966): 40.

External links
 The Spell of the West: Outlaws – Texas Jack
 Legends of America – Old West Outlaws

1862 births
1950 deaths
American outlaws
American evangelists
People from Madison County, Arkansas
People from Tulsa, Oklahoma
Gunslingers of the American Old West